Alf von Chmielowski (22 April 1896 – 23 June 1967) was an Austrian painter. His work was part of the painting event in the art competition at the 1948 Summer Olympics.

References

1896 births
1967 deaths
20th-century Austrian painters
Austrian male painters
Olympic competitors in art competitions
Artists from Olomouc
20th-century Austrian male artists